Changzhi is a prefecture-level city in the southeast of Shanxi Province, China, bordering the provinces of Hebei and Henan to the northeast and east, respectively. Historically, the city was one of the 36 administrative areas (see Administrative Divisions of Qin Dynasty) extant under the reign of the first emperor of a unified China (see Qin Shi Huang).

Nowadays, Changzhi is a transportation centre in Shanxi. Transportations is facilitated by: four controlled-access highways, (Taiyuan-Changzhi, Changzhi-Jincheng, Changzhi-Linfen, and Changzhi-Handan); two railways, (Taiyuan–Jiaozuo Railway and Handan–Changzhi Railway ); three national highways, China National Highway 207, 208 and 309; and Changzhi Wangcun Airport (ITAT Code: CIH, ICAO Code: ZBCZ). Internal transportation also includes a bus and taxi network.

The city is a rising commercial and industrial centre in the southeastern area of Shanxi. In 2011, its GDP ranked 1st out of 11 prefecture-level cities in the province. According to the latest census, in 2020 the city was home to 3,180,884 residents whom 1,214,940 lived in the built-up (or metro) area made of Luzhou and Shangdang Districts. The other 2 urban districts Tunliu and Lucheng are not conurbated yet.

History
In ancient times the area around Changzhi (Including Jincheng) was known as Shangdang. Changzhi was the site of the 1945 Shangdang Campaign, the first battle between the Kuomintang and the People's Liberation Army after the end of World War II. The campaign began in August 1945 and lasted until October. It began when the local Shanxi warlord, Yan Xishan, attempted to retake the region from Communist forces. Yan's forces were eventually defeated by an army led by Liu Bocheng, who was later named one of China's Ten Great Marshals.  Liu's political commissar was Deng Xiaoping, who later became China's "paramount leader". The campaign ended with the complete destruction of Yan's army (Jingsui army, 晋绥军), most of which joined the Communists after surrendering. Following the Shangdang Campaign, the Communists remained in control of the region until they won the civil war in 1949.

The area under the control of People's Government of Changzhi City is divided into 12 county-level administration zone. They are 4 districts Luzhou, Lucheng, Shangdang, and Tunliu; and 8 counties Xiangyuan County, Pingshun County, Licheng County, Huguan County, Zhangzi County, Wuxiang County, Qin County, and Qinyuan County.

Defunct - Jiao District is largely made up of suburban surround the city center of the metropolitan area.

Geography 

Changzhi is located in southeastern Shanxi province, along the southern section of the Taihang Mountains. The majority of the city's area is mountainous, and much of the remaining geography is hilly in nature.

Climate
Changzhi has a rather dry, monsoon-influenced humid continental climate (Köppen Dwa), with cold and very dry winters, and very warm, somewhat humid summers. Typifying the influence of the East Asian Monsoon, a majority of the annual  of precipitation occurs from June to August.

Pollution 
Changzhi's air quality index is monitored by China's Ministry of Environmental Protection (MEP) and city government. A record of daily air quality is published by the local government.

In 2013, a major chemical spill occurred at a fertilizer plant in Changzhi operated by Tianji Coal Chemical Industry Group, polluting major waterways in the region, and impacting areas downstream, such as the city of Handan. Government officials in Handan blamed the city government of Changzhi for covering up the spill for five days, and remaining silent on the spill for the subsequent two months. In February 2013, the Xinhua News Agency announced the results of an official investigation into the spill, resulting in the punishment of 39 people, including then-mayor of Changzhi, Zhang Bao, who was removed from his position.

In 2019, officials from the Shanxi Provincial Government publicly reprimanded officials from seven cities within the province, including Changzhi, following a noticeable spike in pollution.

Education

Higher education 

 Changzhi Medical College
 Changzhi College

High schools 

 Changzhi No.1 Middle School
 Changzhi No.2 Middle School
 Changzhi No.3 Middle School
 Changzhi No.4 Middle School
 Changzhi No.5 Middle School
 Changzhi No.6 Middle School
 Changzhi No.7 Middle School
 Changzhi No.8 Middle School
 Changzhi No.9 Middle School
 Changzhi No.10 Middle School
 Changzhi Experimental Middle School
 Changzhi No.12 Middle School
 Changzhi No.13 Middle School
 Changzhi No.14 Middle School
 Changzhi No.15 Middle School
 Changzhi No.16 Middle School
 Changzhi No.17 Middle School
 Changzhi No.18 Middle School
 Changzhi No.19 Middle School
 Tai-Hang Middle School (Subsidiary Middle School of Changzhi College)

Transportation

Expressways 
Portions of three National Highways run through Changzhi: China National Highway 207, China National Highway 208, and China National Highway 309. National Highways 207 and 208 run along a north-south axis, while National Highway 309 runs along a west-east axis.

The  also runs through the city.

Railway 
Taiyuan–Jiaozuo Railway
Handan–Changzhi Railway

Airport 
Changzhi Wangcun Airport

External links
Official website of Changzhi Government

Notes and references

 
Cities in Shanxi
Prefecture-level divisions of Shanxi
National Forest Cities in China